Rule in My Heart is the first studio album by Beth Croft. Integrity Music alongside Survivor Records released the album on 27 July 2014.

Critical reception

Awarding the album four stars from Worship Leader, Jeremy Armstrong describes, "heavily Brit-pop tones and synthy washes of sound surrounding solid lyric writing centered on worship designed with a youthy vibe." Stephen Curry, rating the album an eight out of ten at Cross Rhythms, writes, "a good set from a songwriter who is emerging as an artist in her own right." Giving the album four stars for Louder Than the Music, Jono Davies states, "There is so much to like about this album as a piece of musical art." Jonathan Andre, indicating in a four star review by 365 Days of Inspiring Media, says the album has, "such honesty, vulnerability and encouragement".

Awards and accolades
This album was No. 16 on the Worship Leader'''s Top 20 Albums of 2014 list.

The song, "Say the Word", was No. 19 on the Worship Leader'''s Top 20 Songs of 2014 list.

Track listing

References

2014 albums
Beth Croft albums